Patriarch Peter V may refer to:

 Patriarch Peter V of Alexandria, Greek Patriarch of Alexandria sometime between the 7th and 8th centuries
 Pope Peter V of Alexandria, Pope of Alexandria & Patriarch of the See of St. Mark in 1340–1348